John Francis "Jack" Saunders (24 August 1924 – June 2013) was an English footballer who played as a centre half in the Football League for Darlington, Chelsea, Crystal Palace and Chester. He also played non-league football for Hyde United and Mossley where he finished his career, making 100 appearances between 1960 and 1963.

References

Chester City F.C. players
Crystal Palace F.C. players
Hyde United F.C. players
Association football central defenders
English Football League players
Darlington F.C. players
Chelsea F.C. players
1924 births
2013 deaths
English footballers
People from Middlesbrough
Mossley A.F.C. players